Diples or Thiples is a Greek dessert from the Peloponnese, made of thin sheet-like dough.  They are essentially the same as angel wings, except that they are dipped in syrup rather than served dry.

The dough is rolled into long, thin strips, fried and folded in hot oil and then dipped in a sugar or honey syrup.
Diples can be made in different shapes, of which the most common are bow ties and spirals.
Diples are a typical dessert in the Peloponnese and are also served at weddings and at New Year's celebrations.

Another form uses an iron mould dipped in diples batter and cooked in cooking oil until the diples separates from the mould. It is topped with syrup, crushed walnuts, and cinnamon.

See also
 List of doughnut varieties

References

External links
 

Doughnuts
Greek desserts
New Year foods